Wong Chen (born 18 December 1968) is a Malaysian politician from the People's Justice Party (PKR) currently serving as Member of Parliament (MP) of Malaysia for  (formerly known as Kelana Jaya) constituency in Selangor.

Wong Chen is currently a member of the Special Select Committee on Finance and Economy alongside several other Members of Parliament from the government and opposition.

Background 
Wong Chen was born in Assunta Hospital, Petaling Jaya in 1968 and spent his early childhood in Kuala Lumpur and Kota Bharu, Kelantan. Wong Chen’s father was a self-made businessman, whereas his mother was a homemaker. He has three siblings, two brothers and a sister. Although Wong Chen was born in Petaling Jaya, he spent much of his early years in Kota Bharu where his father’s business was based and this was also where he received his primary education. Wong Chen continued his studies by attending United World College of South East Asia in Singapore. Subsequently after completing secondary school, he furthered his academic education by reading Law and receiving his law degree from the University of Warwick.

After graduating university, Wong Chen returned to his hometown of Kota Bharu and started practicing law. During his tenure in Kota Bharu, he also did community work by helping the rural poor and powerless through the local legal aid bureau. After spending five years back in his hometown, he then moved to Kuala Lumpur where he became a lawyer specialising in corporate law and information technology. It was during the 1997 Asian Financial Crisis that he began to develop strong feelings within Malaysian politics especially in the wake of the Reformasi Movement.

Political career 
Wong Chen joined PKR in 2009. He was asked by a client to help the formation of Pakatan Rakyat and ended up joining the party as an ad-hoc advisor. He acted as a lawyer and drafted the Pakatan Rakyat constitution and submitted documents to the ROS (Registrar of Societies). He started as an ad hoc advisor to the party and worked with Rafizi Ramli on GST. Later in 2011 he was appointed to become the chairman of the Investment and Trade Bureau of PKR. He was put in charge of creating economic and trade policies for the party. In that capacity he gave press conference on a variety of subjects including FGV, 1MDB and palm oil exports. He was one of the first politicians to speak out against 1MDB and in particular in the issue of 1MDB bonds in 2013. The Financial Times interviewed him on the subject matter and described him as a "rising star of PKR". Subsequently he was interviewed by Reuters, Asian Wall Street Journal and Bloomberg.

Election to Parliament 
Wong Chen was first elected to parliament in the 13th Malaysian general election, winning the seat of Kelana Jaya by defeating National Front (BN) candidate Loh Seng Kok. After the general election, he became an MP and continued to speak on the wider variety of issues including GST, 1MDB and also the general economic landscape of Malaysia. As an MP he also gave views on social and human rights issues including Prevention of Terrorism Act and the Sedition Act.

International Involvements 
Internationally, Wong Chen represents the Parliament of Malaysia for the ASEAN Inter-Parliamentary Assembly (AIPA), represents Asia-Pacific Group for Working Group on Science, Technology, Inter-Parliamentary Union (IPU) and is a member of the ASEAN Parliamentarians for Human Rights (APHR).

KEADILAN Central Leadership Council Member 
In 2022, Wong Chen contested in the Keadilan Party Elections or known as Pemilihan Keadilan 2022. He contested for the Central Leadership Council alongside 73 other candidates for that position consisting of other party members including Members of Parliaments and State Assemblymen. Wong Chen was elected after securing 697 votes and making it to the Top 20 for the position.

Election results

References

Living people
1968 births
People from Selangor
Malaysian Buddhists
Malaysian Taoists
Malaysian politicians of Chinese descent
Malaysian people of Hakka descent
20th-century Malaysian lawyers
People's Justice Party (Malaysia) politicians
Members of the Dewan Rakyat
21st-century Malaysian politicians
People educated at a United World College
21st-century Malaysian lawyers